SVOD may refer to:

 Subscription video on demand (SVoD)
 Streaming video on demand (sVoD)
 Stacked Volumetric Optical Disc (SVOD)
 RSBN-2S Svod (avionics), a short range navigation system found on the Ilyushin Il-18